The 2010–11 St. John's Red Storm men's basketball team represented St. John's University during the 2010–11 NCAA Division I men's basketball season. The team was coached by Steve Lavin in his first year at the school. Saint John's home games were played at Carnesecca Arena and Madison Square Garden and the team is a member of the Big East Conference. They finished the season 21–12, 12–6 in Big East play and lost in the quarterfinals of the 2011 Big East men's basketball tournament to Syracuse. They received an at-large bid in the 2011 NCAA Division I men's basketball tournament where they lost in the first round to Gonzaga.

Off season
On March 30, 2010, Lavin was announced as the head coach of St. John's. Lavin replaced Norm Roberts, who was fired after six seasons as the Red Storm head coach. Lavin named his mentor Gene Keady to the position of Special Assistant.

Departures

Class of 2010 signees

Season
St. John's, a former Big East and national power, had fallen on tough times in recent seasons. This year, the Red Storm (17–9, 9–5 Big East) have made a habit out of knocking off highly ranked teams, with wins over Duke, Notre Dame, Connecticut, Georgetown, and Pittsburgh, all top-15 teams.
The Red Storm are looking for their first NCAA tournament berth since 2002. After defeating then #4 Pittsburgh on February 19, all 63 participating brackets in The Bracket Project placed the Red Storm comfortably within the NCAA Tournament.

The Red Storm also achieved their first Top 25 ranking in over a decade. The last time the Red Storm had previously been ranked was on November 28, 2000. On February 21, the Red Storm were ranked #23 in the AP Poll and #25 in the ESPN/USA Today Coaches Poll.
They reached as high as #15 in both the AP Poll and the ESPN/USA Today Coaches Poll on February 28 following their road win against Villanova.

Roster

Schedule and results

|-
!colspan=9 style=| Exhibition

|-
!colspan=9 style=| Regular season

|-
!colspan=9 style=| Big East tournament

|-
!colspan=9 style=| NCAA tournament

References

St. John's Red Storm men's basketball seasons
St. John's
St. John's
St John
St John